Vanilla walkeriae is a species of vanilla orchid native to India and Sri Lanka. It grows in forest and jungle habitat. It is considered to be a rare species.

Description
This species is an epiphyte with thick, succulent, rooting stems up to 15 meters long that climbs on trees and shrubs. The lance-shaped leaves are up to 3.7 centimeters long. The inflorescence is a large raceme of many flowers. The flower can be up to 6.8 centimeters wide and has wavy-edged white petals. The fruit is a thin capsule up to 15 centimeters long.

The scientific name commemorates Anna Maria Walker of Sri Lanka with whom Robert Wight collaborated.

Uses
The plant is used in the traditional veterinary medicine practices of the Irulas in India. Stem paste is fed to cattle to treat fever and as a nutritional supplement.

Conservation
The species is threatened by commercial overexploitation and habitat destruction.

References

External links
 Vanilla walkeriae illustration. Swiss Orchid Foundation.

walkeriae
Epiphytic orchids
Orchids of India
Orchids of Sri Lanka
Threatened flora of Asia